Henry Hoare II (1705–1785), known as Henry the Magnificent, was an English banker and garden owner-designer.

Family
Henry's grandfather, Richard Hoare, was a goldsmith-banker and Lord Mayor of London. His father, Henry Hoare I, bought the ancestral estate of the Stourtons and built a Palladian villa designed by Colen Campbell. When his father died, Henry Hoare II was 20 years old. He was educated at Westminster School.

Career
Henry dominated the Hoare family through his wealth and personal charisma. He was a partner for nearly 60 years in Hoare's Bank. His nickname, "Henry The Magnificent", derived in part from his influence as a great patron of the Arts, but more particularly because he laid out the gardens at Stourhead in Wiltshire, an estate bought by his father. In the thirty years after his mother died in 1741, he worked on the gardens at Stourhead, planning and planting what became a "masterpiece" of European garden design. In the 'school' of Poussin, it was said to be "more beautiful than any landscape put on canvas". 
The gardens were admired as a showplace and Capability Brown, the renowned landscape gardener, was well known to Henry. In 1734 he was elected Member of Parliament for Salisbury.

He died in 1785 leaving Stourhead to the son of his daughter Ann (1734–1759), Richard Colt Hoare. His younger daughter, Susanna, became Countess of Ailesbury.

References

Further reading
 Hoare, Henry Peregrine Rennie, Hoare's Bank: A Record 1672-1955, 1932, new edition 1955
 Hutchings, Victoria, Messrs Hoare, Bankers: A History of the Hoare Banking Dynasty, 2005

1705 births
1785 deaths
British bankers
British MPs 1734–1741
English landscape architects
Members of the Parliament of Great Britain for English constituencies
People educated at Westminster School, London
Hoare family